The Concerto in C major, RV 558, otherwise known as "Concerto for Diverse Instruments" is an orchestral work by Antonio Vivaldi, written around 1740, with its premiere on the 21st of March of that year.

Analysis 
The work is in 3 movements:

 Allegro molto
 Andante molto
 Allegro

Instrumentation 
Concertino: two recorders, two chalumeau, two mandolins, two theorbos, two trombe marina violins and a cello.

Ripieno: Strings, Basso Continuo.

References 

Concertos by Antonio Vivaldi
1740 compositions
Concertos for multiple instruments
Compositions in C major